Kaharoa is a rural area of New Zealand approximately 20 km from Rotorua and 45 km from Tauranga on the North Island. At its highest point the area is approx. 500m above sea level, with some areas able to see towards the coastline of the eastern Bay of Plenty.

The New Zealand Ministry for Culture and Heritage gives a translation of "large net" for Kaharoa. 

In the main the area is used for farming, formerly dry stock, but increasingly this is being converted to dairy. Some areas have been used for small blocks of forestry and there are areas of native bush, preserved to maintain and support the North Island kōkako, a native bird. Increasingly subdivision of land has taken place, with many former farms also being used as lifestyle blocks.

Demographics
The SA1 area is part of the Tui Ridge statistical area.

The SA1 area had a population of 147 at the 2018 New Zealand census, an increase of 6 people (4.3%) since the 2013 census, and an increase of 21 people (16.7%) since the 2006 census. There were 54 households, comprising 75 males and 72 females, giving a sex ratio of 1.04 males per female. The median age was 44.1 years (compared with 37.4 years nationally), with 27 people (18.4%) aged under 15 years, 27 (18.4%) aged 15 to 29, 72 (49.0%) aged 30 to 64, and 18 (12.2%) aged 65 or older.

Ethnicities were 87.8% European/Pākehā, and 18.4% Māori. People may identify with more than one ethnicity.

Although some people chose not to answer the census's question about religious affiliation, 55.1% had no religion, 26.5% were Christian, 2.0% had Māori religious beliefs and 4.1% had other religions.

Of those at least 15 years old, 27 (22.5%) people had a bachelor's or higher degree, and 24 (20.0%) people had no formal qualifications. The median income was $35,400, compared with $31,800 nationally. 18 people (15.0%) earned over $70,000 compared to 17.2% nationally. The employment status of those at least 15 was that 63 (52.5%) people were employed full-time, 24 (20.0%) were part-time, and 3 (2.5%) were unemployed.

Tui Ridge statistical area

Tui Ridge had a population of 1,617 at the 2018 New Zealand census, an increase of 96 people (6.3%) since the 2013 census, and an increase of 162 people (11.1%) since the 2006 census. There were 585 households, comprising 813 males and 804 females, giving a sex ratio of 1.01 males per female. The median age was 43.1 years (compared with 37.4 years nationally), with 306 people (18.9%) aged under 15 years, 273 (16.9%) aged 15 to 29, 828 (51.2%) aged 30 to 64, and 213 (13.2%) aged 65 or older.

Ethnicities were 88.9% European/Pākehā, 16.7% Māori, 0.9% Pacific peoples, 2.8% Asian, and 1.9% other ethnicities. People may identify with more than one ethnicity.

The percentage of people born overseas was 14.5, compared with 27.1% nationally.

Although some people chose not to answer the census's question about religious affiliation, 59.9% had no religion, 29.3% were Christian, 0.9% had Māori religious beliefs, 0.2% were Buddhist and 1.5% had other religions.

Of those at least 15 years old, 270 (20.6%) people had a bachelor's or higher degree, and 207 (15.8%) people had no formal qualifications. The median income was $39,800, compared with $31,800 nationally. 279 people (21.3%) earned over $70,000 compared to 17.2% nationally. The employment status of those at least 15 was that 774 (59.0%) people were employed full-time, 207 (15.8%) were part-time, and 33 (2.5%) were unemployed.

Education

The school first opened in 1907.

References

External links 
 Kaharoa School Website
 Kaharoa Kōkako Trust

Rotorua Lakes District
Populated places in the Bay of Plenty Region